Laviska Terrell Shenault Jr. (born October 5, 1998) is an American football wide receiver for the Carolina Panthers of the National Football League (NFL). He played college football at Colorado.

Early years
Shenault attended DeSoto High School in DeSoto, Texas, where he played high school football. As a senior, he had 46 receptions for 825 yards and nine touchdowns. He committed to the University of Colorado Boulder to play college football. Shenault also played basketball as a freshman in high school, but quit rather than cut his trademark dreadlocks.

College career
As a freshman at Colorado in 2017, Shenault played in 12 games, recording seven receptions for 168 yards. As a sophomore in 2018, he became a starter and recorded 11 receptions for 211 yards and an 89-yard touchdown in the first game of the season against Colorado State. Against Arizona State, he had 13 receptions for 127 yards with two receiving touchdowns and two rushing. He also caught the 40-yard game winning touchdown against Nebraska on September 18. He ended the season with 86 receptions (leading the NCAA in receptions per game, missing three with an injury; also the third most in a season in school history) for 1,011 yards (4th nationally, 9th best in school history) and six touchdowns, supplemented with 115 yards rushing for five touchdowns. His 2019 junior season was highlighted by returning from a knee injury to break four tackles on a crucial 4th down conversion to set up the game winning field goal over Stanford, and nine receptions for 172 yards a touchdown against USC. After totaling 764 yards and 6 touchdowns that year, Shenault decided to forgo his senior year and declare for the 2020 NFL Draft. At the time, he was the 11th Buffalo all-time in receiving yards and 8th in receptions, he was also tied for 5th with over 100 yards receiving in eight of his 27 games.

Professional career

Jacksonville Jaguars 
Shenault was selected by the Jacksonville Jaguars in the second round of the 2020 NFL Draft with the 42nd overall pick, the 9th of 35 wide receivers. In the first game of the 2020 season against the Indianapolis Colts, Shenault caught three passes for 37 yards and an 18-yard touchdown that tied the game at 14 late in the second quarter of the 27–20 victory. In the last game of the season, also against the Colts, he caught both of his teams touchdowns in a 14-28 loss. His 58 receptions for 600 yards (6th and 7th among rookies) was a rare positive for the 1-15 Jaguars.

His second season was highlighted by 110 scrimmage yards in a week 4 loss to Cincinnati. His 63 receptions for 619 yards were the most for a player with 0 touchdowns in 2021, and second on the team to Marvin Jones.

Carolina Panthers 
Shenault was traded to the Carolina Panthers on August 29, 2022 in exchange for 2023 seventh-round and 2024 sixth-round picks. In his first game with the team, he caught a 67-yard touchdown from Baker Mayfield in a Week 3 victory over the New Orleans Saints.

References

External links
Colorado Buffaloes bio

1998 births
Living people
People from DeSoto, Texas
Players of American football from Texas
Sportspeople from the Dallas–Fort Worth metroplex
American football wide receivers
Colorado Buffaloes football players
Jacksonville Jaguars players
Carolina Panthers players